Dan Păltinișanu (23 March 1951 – 4 March 1995) was a Romanian footballer who played as a defender.

Club career
Dan Păltinișanu was born in Bucharest, he started playing football in the youth systems of TM București and Dinamo București. He started his senior career at FC Brașov, making his Divizia A debut on 11 June 1972 in a 0–0 against Politehnica Iași. After playing only one Divizia A match for FC Brașov, Păltinișanu went to play one season in the second division for Metrom Brașov. For ten seasons starting from 1973 until 1983, Păltinișanu played for Politehnica Timișoara, winning the 1979–80 Cupa României in which he scored the decisive goal in the 2–1 victory of the final against Steaua București, appearing in 271 Divizia A matches in which he scored 24 goals and playing in 9 games in which he scored 4 goals in European competitions. He scored the goal that secured Politehnica Timișoara's 1–0 victory in the second leg against Celtic in the 1980–81 European Cup Winners' Cup which helped Politehnica advance to the next phase of the competition. He spent the last two years of his career playing in the third league for Unirea Sânnicolau Mare.

For his performances achieved at Politehnica Timișoara, the Dan Păltinișanu Stadium from Timișoara was named in his honor.

Păltinișanu won the Universiade gold medal with Romania's students football team in the 1974 edition of the tournament that was held in France, playing alongside László Bölöni, Gheorghe Mulțescu, Romulus Chihaia and Paul Cazan.

International career
Dan Păltinișanu played three games at international level for Romania, making his debut on 31 May 1978 under coach Ștefan Kovács in a 1–1 against Bulgaria at the 1977–80 Balkan Cup. His following two games were friendlies, a 1–0 loss against East Germany and a 3–1 loss against Soviet Union.

Personal life
His son, who is also named Dan Păltinișanu, was a basketball player who played for Romania's national basketball team and won the Romanian Basketball Cup while playing for BCM Elba Timișoara in 2010.

Honours
Politehnica Timișoara
Cupa României: 1979–80

References

External links

1951 births
1995 deaths
Footballers from Bucharest
Romanian footballers
Romania international footballers
Liga I players
Liga II players
Liga III players
FC Politehnica Timișoara players
CS Unirea Sânnicolau Mare players
FC Brașov (1936) players
FC Dinamo București players
Association football central defenders
Association football defenders